The Council of the Isles of Scilly is a sui generis unitary local government authority covering the Isles of Scilly off the west coast of Cornwall. It is currently made up of 16 seats, with all councillors being independents. The council was created in 1890 as the Isles of Scilly Rural District Council and was renamed in 1974.

History
Historically, the Isles of Scilly were administered as one of the hundreds of Cornwall, although the Cornwall quarter sessions had limited jurisdiction there. For judicial, shrievalty and lieutenancy purposes, the Local Government Act 1972 provided that the Isles of Scilly are "deemed to form part of the county of Cornwall". The archipelago is part of the Duchy of Cornwall – the duchy owns the freehold of most of the land on the islands and the Duke exercises certain formal rights and privileges across the territory, as he does in Cornwall proper.

The Local Government Act 1888 allowed the Local Government Board to establish in the Isles of Scilly "councils and other local authorities separate from those of the county of Cornwall"... "for the application to the islands of any act touching local government." Accordingly, in 1890, the Isles of Scilly Rural District Council (the RDC) was formed as a sui generis local government authority, outside the administrative county of Cornwall. Cornwall County Council provided some services to the Isles, for which the RDC made financial contributions. The Isles of Scilly Order 1930 granted the council the "powers, duties and liabilities" of a county council. Section 265 of the Local Government Act 1972 allowed for the continued existence of the RDC, but renamed as the Council of the Isles of Scilly.

This unusual status also means that much administrative law (for example relating to the functions of local authorities, the health service and other public bodies) that applies in the rest of England applies in modified form in the islands.

The Council of the Isles of Scilly is a separate authority to the Cornwall Council unitary authority, and as such the islands are not part of the non-metropolitan county of Cornwall. However, the islands are still considered to be part of the ceremonial county of Cornwall. With a total population of just over 2,000, the council represents fewer inhabitants than many English parish councils, and is by far the smallest English unitary council.

Administration
The council also performs the administrative functions of the AONB Partnership and the Inshore Fisheries and Conservation Authority.

Some aspects of local government are shared with Cornwall, including health, and the Council of the Isles of Scilly together with Cornwall Council form a local enterprise partnership. In July 2015 a devolution deal was announced by the government under which Cornwall Council and the Council of the Isles of Scilly are to create a plan to bring health and social care services together under local control. The Local Enterprise Partnership is also to be bolstered.

, 130 people are employed full-time by the council to provide local services (including water supply and air traffic control). These numbers are significant, in that almost ten per cent of the adult population of the islands is directly linked to the council, as an employee or a councillor.

Premises
The council has its offices at Town Hall on The Parade in Hugh Town on St Mary's, the largest island. The town hall was built in 1887–1889. Council meetings are held a short distance away at the council chamber, which is the Old Wesleyan Chapel on Garrison Lane, which was built in 1828.

Elections

The council consists of 16 elected councillors – 12 of which are returned by the ward of St Mary's, and one from each of four "off-island" wards (St Martin's, St Agnes, Bryher, and Tresco). The latest elections took place on 6 May 2021; independents won all seats, with the off-island wards all seeing uncontested elections. The number of councillors elected in each ward was reduced by one for the 2017 local elections, with the islands previously being represented by 21 councillors representing unchanged ward boundaries.

Whilst each of the inhabited isles is formally a civil parish, none of them possess a council or meeting in their own right.

Elections to the council were last held in May 2021. Independent candidates won all seats, with St Martin's, St Agnes, Bryher, and Tresco seeing uncontested elections.

Notes and references

External links

Council of the Isles of Scilly official website

Unitary authority councils of England
Local education authorities in England
Billing authorities in England
Local authorities in Cornwall
Council of the Isles of Scilly